Kelvin Geoffrey Davis (born 29 September 1976) is an English former footballer who played as a goalkeeper. He began his career with Luton Town as a youth player in 1991 and remained there until 1999. Davis later played for Wimbledon, Ipswich Town and Sunderland before moving to Southampton in 2006.

Davis was team captain of Southampton from 2009 to 2012, after which he became club captain. From July 2016 to December 2017, Davis had been working as part of the support staff at Southampton. On 29 December 2017, Davis became Senior First Team coach following the resignation of Eric Black the previous week until parting ways with Southampton in 2022.

Club career

Early career
Davis was born in Bedford, Bedfordshire and started his career as a trainee with Luton Town, turning professional in July 1994. He joined Torquay United on loan in September 1994 as cover for the injured Ashley Bayes, making his debut in the 3–3 draw at home to Colchester United on 17 September. He also played in the 2–1 defeat at home to Barnet the following week before returning to Luton. He had a further loan spell, with Hartlepool United in August 1997. He joined Wimbledon in July 1999 for a fee of £600,000.

Ipswich Town
Davis joined Ipswich Town on a free transfer in July 2003, He quickly became the first-choice goalkeeper at Ipswich, making 45 appearances during his first season at the club. He kept his place in the team the following season. His form during the season earned him a place of the 2004–05 PFA Championship Team of the Year, whilst also helping steer Ipswich to third in the table.

Sunderland
Davis joined Sunderland in June 2005 for a fee of £1.25 million, and played in most of their Premier League games in the 2005–06 season, as Sunderland were relegated.

Southampton
In an attempt to rebuild his career after his difficult spell at Sunderland, Davis joined Southampton in July 2006 for a fee reported to be around £2 million. He linked up with former goalkeeping coach Malcolm Webster, who coached him during his spell at Ipswich. At Southampton, he was first choice goalkeeper for most of the 2006–07 season until a three-match ban relegated him to the bench where he remained after the return of Bartosz Białkowski. He was suspended for three games after kicking out at Stoke City's striker Jon Parkin on 10 March 2007.

His form for Saints in the first half of the 2008–09 season was impressive, despite the club's poor form. Southampton fans voted Davis player of the month three times in the first five months of the season on the club's official website.

On 9 July 2009, Davis turned down the opportunity to sign for then Premier League side West Ham United, instead signing a new three-year contract with Southampton which meant that he would remain at Southampton until May 2012. On 8 August 2009, he saved an Alan Dunne penalty in a 1–1 draw with Millwall. He was voted in the League one PFA team of year in 2009–10 season after a string of outstanding performances. He was again named in the League One Team of the Year for the 2010–11 season. On 23 November 2010, he saved a Chris Wood penalty in a 0–0 draw with Brighton & Hove Albion.

On 28 July 2011, Davis signed a new deal with Saints to keep him at the club until 2014. On 3 March 2012, Kelvin Davis put in a superb performance between the sticks against a rampant Leeds United to help secure a clean sheet, and one-nil win, for Southampton against the Yorkshire club at Elland Road. The performance earned the 35-year-old a place in the Championship Team of the Week.

He was named in the Championship Team of the Year for the 2011–12 season, meaning he had been named in a team of the year for three consecutive years. He saved a David Silva penalty on the opening day of the 2012–13 season against Manchester City, but this could not help the club from being beaten 3–2. He saved a Robin van Persie penalty in a game against Manchester United, but once again the club were beaten 3–2.

On 7 March 2013, Davis signed a new contract with Southampton, keeping him at the club until 2016.

He made his 300th appearance for the club on the final day of the 2014–15 season.

Testimonial
On 17 May 2016, a special testimonial match in recognition of his 10 years' service to Southampton was held in his honour. The fixture organised by Davis's testimonial committee was played two days after the close of the 2015–16 season and featured the current Saints side and a selection of players that took part in the 2010–11 and 2011–12 seasons in which Southampton won back-to-back promotions. His favoured charity, the Southampton-based Liver and Pancreatic Cancer Research & Development Charity, was a key beneficiary from money raised on the night.

Later career
On 13 July 2016, Davis was appointed as Football Development Executive at Southampton to provide support to the players in the first team. On 29 December 2017 Davis was appointed as senior first team coach following the resignation of Eric Black.

On 3 December 2018, he was placed in temporary charge of the first team, following the dismissal of manager Mark Hughes.

On 25 May 2022, Southampton parted ways with Davis after confirming a change within the coaching team.

Career statistics

Honours
Southampton
Football League Championship runner-up: 2011–12
Football League One runner-up: 2010–11
Football League Trophy: 2009–10

Individual
PFA Team of the Year: 2004–05 Championship, 2009–10 League One, 2010–11 League One, 2011–12 Championship
Ipswich Town Players' Player of the Year: 2004–05
Southampton Player of the Season: 2008–09

References

External links
Kelvin Davis player profile

1976 births
Living people
Sportspeople from Bedford
English footballers
England under-21 international footballers
Association football goalkeepers
Luton Town F.C. players
Torquay United F.C. players
Hartlepool United F.C. players
Wimbledon F.C. players
Ipswich Town F.C. players
Sunderland A.F.C. players
Southampton F.C. players
English Football League players
Premier League players
Southampton F.C. managers
Southampton F.C. non-playing staff
English football managers
Footballers from Bedfordshire